Szilvia may refer to:

Szilvia Mednyánszky (born 1971), Hungarian sprint canoeist
Szilvia Péter Szabó (born 1982), the singer of the Hungarian band NOX
Szilvia Szabó (born 1978), Hungarian sprint canoeist